Waada is a town in the Zoungou Department of Ganzourgou Province in central Burkina Faso. In 2005 the town had a population of 2,522.

References

Populated places in the Plateau-Central Region
Ganzourgou Province